Sir Edwin McCarthy  (30 March 18964 September 1980) was a senior Australian public servant and diplomat. He was a prominent senior trade official, including as head of the Department of Commerce and Agriculture between 1945 and 1950.

Life and career 
McCarthy was born in Walhalla, Victoria on 30 March 1896 to parents Catherine McCarthy (née Kennedy) and Daniel McCarthy.

He joined the Commonwealth Public Service as a messenger in the Postmaster-General's Department in April 1911.

McCarthy married Marjorie Mary Graham on 4 July 1939 in Sydney. The couple had two children: a daughter, and a son, John McCarthy.

From 1945 to 1950, McCarthy was Secretary of the Department of Commerce and Agriculture. His primary expertise was grain commodity matters, and he devised the Australian wheat price stabilisation scheme after World War II.

Between 1958 and 1962, McCarthy was Australian Ambassador to the Netherlands. He was accredited to Belgium also, from 1959.

In 1962, McCarthy was appointed Head of the Australian Permanent Mission to the European Atomic Energy Community in Brussels.

McCarthy died on 4 September 1980 at Woden Valley Hospital in Garran, Canberra. He had been admitted earlier within the same week after a brain aneurysm.

Awards 
McCarthy was appointed a Commander of the Order of the British Empire in June 1952, while serving as Deputy High Commissioner in London. He was made a Knight Bachelor in June 1955, whilst serving in the same role.

References 

1896 births
1980 deaths
Australian Knights Bachelor
Australian Commanders of the Order of the British Empire
Ambassadors of Australia to the European Union
Ambassadors of Australia to Belgium
Ambassadors of Australia to the Netherlands